Sant Andreu, Catalan for Saint Andrew, may refer to:

Places
Sant Andreu, one of the ten districts of Barcelona
Sant Andreu de Llavaneres, municipality in the comarca of Maresme
Sant Andreu de Palomar, neighborhood in the Sant Andreu district of Barcelona 
Sant Andreu de la Barca, municipality in the comarca of the Baix Llobregat
Sant Andreu Salou, village in the province of Girona

Railway stations
Sant Andreu (Barcelona Metro)
Sant Andreu Arenal railway station
Sant Andreu Comtal railway station

Other uses
Sant Andreu de Tresponts, Benedictine monastery in the Province of Lleida
UE Sant Andreu, Spanish football team
Sant Andreu Jazz Band